The Roman Consul Stakes is an Australian Turf Club Group 2 Thoroughbred horse race for three-year-olds, at set weights, over a distance of 1200 metres. It is held annually at Randwick Racecourse, Sydney in early October. Total prize money for the race is A$300,000.

History
The race is named after the late 1960s racehorse Roman Consul, who won the Chelmsford Stakes three times (1967–69). Prior to 2006 the race was run in early September.

Grade
 1979–1983 – Listed race
 1984–2004 – Group 3
 2005 onwards – Group 2

Distance
 1979–2000  – 1200 metres
 2001 – 1100 metres 
 2002 onwards – 1200 metres

Venue
 1979–1999 –  Randwick Racecourse
 2000 – Rosehill Racecourse
 2001–2003 –  Randwick Racecourse
 2004 – Warwick Farm Racecourse
 2005 onwards – Randwick Racecourse

Winners

 2021 – Paulele
 2020 – Wild Ruler
 2019 – Cosmic Force 
 2018 – Sesar
 2017 – Viridine
 2016 –  Russian Revolution
 2015 – Exosphere
 2014 – Brazen Beau
 2013 – Zoustar
 2012 – Jolie Bay
 2011 – Foxwege
 2010 – Buffering
 2009 – Shellscrape
 2008 – Montana Flyer
 2007 – †race not held
 2006 – Reigning to Win
 2005 – Denmarket
 2004 – Fastnet Rock
 2003 – Exceed And Excel
 2002 – Snowland
 2001 – Stylish Lass
 2000 – Kootoomootoo
 1999 – Easy Rocking
 1998 – Laurie's Lottery
 1997 – Encounter
 1996 – Anthems
 1995 – Our Maizcay
 1994 – Marwina
 1993 – Jetball
 1992 – Slight Chance
 1991 – Prince of Praise
 1990 – Bureaucracy
 1989 – Show County
 1988 – Wonder Dancer
 1987 – Christmas Tree
 1986 – Rendoo
 1985 – Wat of the Moment
 1984 – Red Anchor
 1983 – March Magic 
 1982 – Andretti 
 1981 – Swift Gun 
 1980 – Hanalei 
 1979 – Meriville

† Not held because of outbreak of equine influenza

See also
 List of Australian Group races
 Group races

References

Horse races in Australia
Randwick Racecourse
Recurring sporting events established in 1978
1978 establishments in Australia